Big Bang Generation is a BBC Books original novel written by Gary Russell and based on the long-running British science fiction television series Doctor Who. It features the Twelfth Doctor and Bernice Summerfield, making her first appearance in the New Series Adventures along with the Doctor from the revived series. The book was released on 10 September 2015 as a part of The Glamour Chronicles, alongside Royal Blood and Deep Time.

Audiobook 

An unabridged audiobook version of Big Bang Generation was released on 1 October 2015. It was read by Lisa Bowerman who played the part of a Cheetah person named Karra in the 1989 Doctor Who story Survival. She also voices the character of Bernice Summerfield in many audio plays, released on CD by Big Finish.

References

External links 
 
 

2015 British novels
2015 science fiction novels
New Series Adventures
Twelfth Doctor novels
Novels by Gary Russell
Novels set in Sydney
Fiction set in 1934